A protoplanet is a large planetary embryo that originated within a protoplanetary disc and has undergone internal melting to produce a differentiated interior. Protoplanets are thought to form out of kilometer-sized planetesimals that gravitationally perturb each other's orbits and collide, gradually coalescing into the dominant planets.

The planetesimal hypothesis
A planetesimal is an object formed from dust, rock, and other materials, measuring from meters to hundreds of kilometers in size. 
According to the Chamberlin–Moulton planetesimal hypothesis and the theories of Viktor Safronov, a protoplanetary disk of materials such as gas and dust would orbit a star early in the formation of a planetary system.  The action of gravity on such  materials form larger and larger chunks until some reach the size of planetesimals.

It is thought that the collisions of planetesimals created a few hundred larger planetary embryos. Over the course of hundreds of millions of years, they collided with one another. The exact sequence whereby planetary embryos collided to assemble the planets is not known, but it is thought that initial collisions would have replaced the first "generation" of embryos with a second generation consisting of fewer but larger embryos. These in their turn would have collided to create a third generation of fewer but even larger embryos. Eventually, only a handful of embryos were left, which collided to complete the assembly of the planets proper.

Early protoplanets had more radioactive elements, the quantity of which has been reduced over time due to radioactive decay. Heating due to radioactivity, impact, and gravitational pressure melted parts of protoplanets as they grew toward being planets. In melted zones their heavier elements sank to the center, whereas lighter elements rose to the surface. Such a process is known as planetary differentiation. The composition of some meteorites show that differentiation took place in some asteroids.

Evidence of protoplanets in the Solar System
In the case of the Solar System, it is thought that the collisions of planetesimals created a few hundred planetary embryos. Such embryos were similar to Ceres and Pluto with masses of about 1022 to 1023 kg and were a few thousand kilometers in diameter.

According to the giant impact hypothesis the Moon formed from a colossal impact of a hypothetical protoplanet called Theia with Earth, early in the Solar System's history.

In the inner Solar System, the three protoplanets to survive more-or-less intact are the asteroids Ceres, Pallas, and Vesta. Psyche is likely the survivor of a violent hit-and-run with another object that stripped off the outer, rocky layers of a protoplanet. The asteroid Metis may also have a similar origin history to that of Psyche. The asteroid Lutetia also has characteristics that resemble a protoplanet. Kuiper-belt dwarf planets have also been referred to as protoplanets. Because iron meteorites have been found on Earth, it is deemed likely that there once were other metal-cored protoplanets in the asteroid belt that since have been disrupted and that are the source of these meteorites.

Observed protoplanets
In February 2013 astronomers made the first direct observation of a candidate protoplanet forming in a disk of gas and dust around a distant star,  HD 100546. Subsequent observations suggest that several protoplanets may be present in the gas disk.

Another protoplanet, AB Aur b, may be in the earliest observed stage of formation for a gas giant. It is located in the gas disk of the star AB Aurigae. AB Aur b is among the largest exoplanets identified, and has a  distant orbit, three times as far as Neptune is from the Earth's sun. Observations of AB Aur b may challenge conventional thinking about how planets are formed. It was viewed by the Subaru Telescope and the Hubble Space Telescope.

Rings, gaps, spirals, dust concentrations and shadows in protoplanetary disks could be caused by protoplanets. These structures are not completely understood and are therefore not seen as a proof for the presence of a protoplanet.

One new emerging way to study the effect of protoplanets on the disk are molecular line observations of protoplanetary disks in the form of gas velocity maps. HD 97048 b is the first protoplanet detected by disk kinematics in the form of a kink in the gas velocity map. Other disks like around IM Lupi show similar kinks in their gas velocity map. Another candidate exoplanet, called HD 169142 b, was first directly imaged in 2014 and it also causes a similar disturbance in its gas velocity map. HD 169142 b additionally shows multiple lines of evidence to be a protoplanet.

See also
 Accretion (astrophysics)
 Fusor (astronomy)
 Mesoplanet
 Planetesimal

References

External links 
Thread on the definition of a protoplanet (Minor Planet Mailing List : July 15, 2011)

 
Types of planet